Renucleation technology. 

It is a new type of embryonic culture enables scientists to transfer a fertilized nucleus of an ovum  ( with diploid number 2n) into unfertilized one after destroying its nucleus using radiation. and replaced by a nucleus of embryonic cell of another individual

Process 

When the fertilized ovum is transplanted to the mother's ovary it develops into a normal individual which has gained its characters from the parents (source of the 2n nucleus).
This proves that the early embryonic cell nucleus is capable to direct the embryonic development in a manner similar to that of the zygote nucleus itself

References

Cell biology